The 1942–43 AHL season was the seventh season of the American Hockey League. Seven teams played 56 games each in the schedule, while an eighth team, the New Haven Eagles ceased operations 32 games into the season, in January 1943. The Buffalo Bisons won the F. G. "Teddy" Oke Trophy as the Western Division champions, and their first Calder Cup as league champions.

Team changes
 The Philadelphia Rockets cease operations.
 The Springfield Indians cease operations.
 The Hershey Bears switch divisions from West to East.
 The New Haven Eagles ceased operations midseason.

Final standings
Note: GP = Games played; W = Wins; L = Losses; T = Ties; GF = Goals for; GA = Goals against; Pts = Points;

† New Haven Eagles ceased operations midseason.

Scoring leaders

Note: GP = Games played; G = Goals; A = Assists; Pts = Points; PIM = Penalty minutes

 complete list

Calder Cup playoffs

See also
List of AHL seasons

References
AHL official site
AHL Hall of Fame
HockeyDB

American Hockey League seasons
2